The Germany women's national artistic gymnastics team represents Germany in FIG international competitions.

History
Germany has participated in the Olympic Games women's team competition nine times (twice as the United Team of Germany).  They have won one medal, a gold in 1936.

Current senior roster

Team competition results

Olympic Games
 1928 — did not participate
 1936 —  gold medal
 1948 — banned from participating 
 1952 — 5th place
 1956 — did not participate
 1960 — 6th place (competed as United Team of Germany)
 1964 — 4th place (competed as United Team of Germany)
 1968 through 1988 — participated as East Germany and West Germany
 1992 — 9th place
 1996 — did not participate
 2000 — did not participate
 2004 — did not participate
 2008 — 12th place
 2012 — 9th place
 2016 —  6th place
Tabea Alt, Kim Bui, Pauline Schäfer, Sophie Scheder, Elisabeth Seitz
 2020 —  9th place
Kim Bui, Pauline Schäfer, Elisabeth Seitz, Sarah Voss

World Championships

 2006 — (qualifications)
Daria Bijak, Kim Bui, Oksana Chusovitina, Heike Gunne, Svenja Hickel, Theresa Sporer
 2007 — 10th (qualifications)
Katja Abel, Anja Brinker, Jenny Brunner, Oksana Chusovitina, Marie-Sophie Hindermann, Joeline Möbius
 2010 — 14th (qualifications)
Oksana Chusovitina, Lisa Katharina Hill, Giulia Hindermann, Joeline Möbius, Elisabeth Seitz, Pia Tolle
 2011 — 6th
Kim Bui, Oksana Chusovitina, Lisa Katharina Hill, Nadine Jarosch, Elisabeth Seitz, Pia Tolle
 2014 — 9th (qualifications)
Cagla Akyol, Kim Bui, Lisa Katharina Hill, Pauline Schäfer, Sophie Scheder, Elisabeth Seitz
 2015 – 12th (qualifications)
Leah Griesser, Lisa Katharina Hill, Pauline Schäfer, Sophie Scheder, Elisabeth Seitz, Pauline Tratz
 2018 — 8th
Kim Bui, Leah Griesser, Sophie Scheder, Elisabeth Seitz, Sarah Voss
 2019 — 9th (qualifications)
Kim Bui, Emelie Petz, Pauline Schäfer, Elisabeth Seitz, Sarah Voss
 2022 – 12th (qualifications)
Anna-Lena König, Emma Malewski, Lea Marie Quaas, Karina Schönmaier, Elisabeth Seitz

Junior World Championships
 2019 — 8th
Jasmin Haase, Emma Leonie Malewski, Lea Marie Quaas

Most decorated gymnasts
This list includes all German female artistic gymnasts who have won a medal at the Olympic Games or the World Artistic Gymnastics Championships.  It only includes medals won while Germany competed as a unified team and not separately as East Germany and West Germany. Additionally, for Oksana Chusovitina it only includes medals she won while competing for Germany.

See also
 German Artistic Gymnastics Championships
 Germany men's national gymnastics team
 List of Olympic female artistic gymnasts for Germany

References

Gymnastics in Germany
National women's artistic gymnastics teams
Women's national sports teams of Germany